Harijan Sevak Sangh is a non-profit organisation founded by Mahatma Gandhi in 1932 to eradicate untouchability in India, working for Harijan or Dalit people and upliftment of Depressed Class of India. It is headquartered at Kingsway Camp in Delhi, with branches in 26 states across India.

History
After the Second Round Table Conference, British government agreed to give Communal Award to the depressed classes on the request of B. R. Ambedkar. Gandhi opposed the government's decision which he considered it would divide the Hindu society and subsequently went on to the indefinite fast in Yerwada Jail. He ended his fast after signed Poona Pact with Ambedkar on 24 September 1932. On 30 September, Gandhi founded All India Anti Untouchability League, to remove untouchability in the society, which later renamed as Harijan Sevak Sangh ("Servants of Harijan Society"). At the time industrialist Ghanshyam Das Birla was its founding president with Amritlal Takkar as its secretary.

Harijan Sevak Sangh runs two schools in the state of Tamil Nadu, a residential middle school in Villupuram district and N M R Subbaraman memorial residential primary school in Madurai.
The school in Villupuram was set up in 1993 and currently has 180 scheduled caste and 109 other backward classes students.
The students mostly belong to migrant labourers. The school has got 9 teaching and non-teaching staff.
The Madurai's school was built in 1979. It presently has 5 teaching and non-teaching faculty members.

Headquarters 
The Sangh is headquartered at Kingsway Camp in Delhi. It was Valmiki Bhawan within the campus, which functioned as Gandhiji's one-room ashram,  Kasturba Gandhi and their children stayed at the nearby Kasturba Kutir, between April 1946 and June 1947, before he moved to Birla House. Today, the 20-acre campus includes the Gandhi ashram, Harijan Basti, Lala Hans Raj Gupta Industrial Training Institute and also has a residential school for boys and girls. Its headquarter Gandhi Ashram, Kingsway Camp is listed as Gandhian Heritage Site by the Ministry of Culture, Govt. of India. Gandhian Heritage Sites | Ministry of Culture, Government of India

Activities 
The Sangh helped the depressed classes to access public places such as temples, schools, roads and water resources, also conducted inter dining and inter caste marriages. It constructed and maintains several schools and hostels across the country.

In 1939, Harijan Sevak Sangh of Tamil Nadu headed by A. Vaidyanatha Iyer entered the Meenakshi Amman Temple in Madurai, with members of depressed class including P. Kakkan despite opposition from the upper caste Hindus. The Sangh led by Iyer organised several temple entry movements in other Parts of Tamil Nadu and in Travancore. Through their movements, more than 100 temples were opened to all sections of the society.

Bibliography

References

External links
 Harijan Sevak Sangh, website

Anti-caste movements
Dalit
Mahatma Gandhi
Non-profit organisations based in India
Organizations established in 1932
Organisations based in Delhi
1932 establishments in India